Song Joon-seok (also spelled Song Jun-seok; born January 18, 1969, in Jeolla) is a South Korean voice actor who joined the Munhwa Broadcasting Corporation's voice acting division in 1997. Currently, he is cast in the Korea TV Edition of "CSI: Crime Scene Investigation" as Warrick Brown, replacing Gary Dourdan.

Roles

Broadcast TV
CSI: Crime Scene Investigation (replacing Gary Dourdan, Korea TV Edition, MBC)
24 (replacing Billy Burke, Korea TV Edition, MBC)
Iron Kid (KBS)
Bobobo-bo Bo-bobo (Korea TV Edition, KBS) as Softon (Replacing Hikaru Midorikawa's voice)

Movie Dubbing
25's Kiss (replacing Thomas Salomy, Korea TV Edition, MBC)
Underworld (replacing Shane Brolly, Korea TV Edition, MBC)
Madagascar - Melman

Gaming Voice
Dynasty Warriors
Genshin Impact - Arataki Itto

See also
Munhwa Broadcasting Corporation
MBC Voice Acting Division

External links
Daum Cafe Voice Actor Song Joon-seok (in Korean)
MBC Voice Acting division Song Joon-seok blog (in Korean)

Living people
South Korean male voice actors
1969 births